Lover's Island is a 1925 American silent drama film directed by Henri Diamant-Berger and starring Hope Hampton, James Kirkwood, and Louis Wolheim.

Plot
As described in a film magazine review, the traditions of a small fishing town command that only couples who are to be married may go to Lover’s Island. However, Clemmy Dawson, the niece of a fisherman, goes there alone. A villainous townsman follows her, but her uncle arrives in time to frighten him off. A young male visitor later arrives at the island, and the young woman’s uncle, believing him to be the man he has once chased away, attempts to force him to marry his niece. The young woman objects, and declares she will marry the villain. This the visitor, who himself loves the woman, prevents by winning her love.

Cast

References

Bibliography
 Munden, Kenneth White. The American Film Institute Catalog of Motion Pictures Produced in the United States, Part 1. University of California Press, 1997.

External links
 

1925 films
1925 drama films
1920s English-language films
American silent feature films
Silent American drama films
Pathé Exchange films
American black-and-white films
Films directed by Henri Diamant-Berger
1920s American films